WLVX (107.1 FM) is a radio station licensed to Greenville, Pennsylvania. It operates 24 hours per day, 7 days per week at 2,100 watts.

The station is owned by Educational Media Foundation, who officially received assignment of the licenses of WEXC, WLOA and WGRP from Beacon Broadcasting on December 23, 2010. Vilkie Communications assumed control of WLOA and WGRP from Educational Media Foundation on December 15, 2011.

WLVX is an affiliate of EMF's national non-commercial Adult Contemporary radio network  playing Contemporary Christian music.

Broadcast history
WLVX was originally a locally focused voice for the communities of Greenville, Pennsylvania, The Shenango Valley, and Youngstown, Ohio. The 107.1 frequency was first registered as WGRP-FM, a sister signal to the then co-owned WGRP 940-AM. The WEXC calls were first registered for 107.1 on May 16, 1985. The first DJ hired on WEXC FM was J. Robert Irvine, (Bob James) until 1986 when he moved to Television at WYTV, WTAE and KDKA until 1992 when he started at WKBN TV Production and News until 1999. Later he return as manager for Beacon Broadcasting in 2000 -2003. On January 7, 2011, soon after the FCC approved the sale of the station to EMF, WLVX became the new call.

The station's final incarnation under Beacon Broadcasting ownership was C-107.1, an adult contemporary format. Prior to C-107.1 and the Christian rock formats of Freq 107 and Indie 107, the station was known as "Goodtime Oldies WEX-C 107", a format which ran from 2001 to 2003. Christian adult contemporary ran prior to the 2001 incarnation of oldies, while mainstream adult contemporary was aired prior to Beacon Broadcasting purchasing the station. WEXC was an affiliate of the Pittsburgh Pirates Baseball Network. The baseball broadcasts have since been moved to WLLF ESPN 96.7 Mercer, PA.

In 1998, WEXC and WGRP were sold to Youngstown-based Beacon Broadcasting. Beacon's principal owner, Harold Glunt was a steel supply company owner from the surrounding Warren, Ohio area. He purchased the stations to further Christian communications in the valley, concurrently, WEXC dropped the oldies format to assume a Christian rock format known as Freq 107 (which was later renamed Indie 107). Before the sale to EMF, WEXC changed formats to the "Today's Hits and Yesterday's Favorites" Hot AC genre as C-107.1, boosting their listenership greatly. During the Goodtime Oldies format, an on-air joke started from Gene Habbyshaw about Bob's voice (Bob Irvine) being the only one in the computer. BOB FM, then later the slogan changed to "we play anything" as Bob came up with a format that started playing a random play, any style and genre of music, that was anything but polka. Jimmy Pol (Steelers fight song) owned a competing station WWIZ  in Hermatige, PA that played a polka party show. So we didn't play polka music. A large variety of music in the computer would connect to a music service via satellite. The format was sold to another group that syndicated it to other stations such as Jack, Frank and most notably Bob FM.

"C-107.1" had been getting more involved in the community under the direction of G.M. Richard Esbenshade and air talent Gregg "Allen" Robison and John "The Madman" Madden. In addition to carrying syndicated talk hosts Glenn Beck and Jason Lewis, WEXC also started to air Donny Osmond's syndicated morning show. Most recently, the station was involved in one of several "Tea Parties" being held all across the country. C-107 also sponsored live concert events and giveaways for Kennywood and Waldameer Amusement Parks.

Harold Glunt died on January 22, 2010; his son subsequently put all of the Beacon stations up for sale. As of Friday, September 10, 2010, a sale of WEXC, WGRP and WLOA to Educational Media Foundation for $225,000 was announced, with an intent to spin off WGRP and WLOA to separate owners. The Hot AC format was dropped to relay the "K-LOVE" Christian music network following the conclusion of a high school football game that evening.

References

1967 Broadcasting Yearbook

External links

K-Love radio stations
Radio stations established in 1965
1965 establishments in Pennsylvania
Educational Media Foundation radio stations
LVX
LVX